The American Association Rookie of the Year Award was an annual award given to the best rookie player in Minor League Baseball's American Association based on their regular-season performance. Though the league was established in 1902, the award was not created until 1946. It continued to be issued through the 1962 season, after which the league disbanded. In 1969, both the league and the award were revived, and the honor continued to be given until the league disbanded for a second time after the 1997 season.

Eighteen outfielders won the Rookie of the Year Award, the most of any position. First basemen, second basemen, and shortstops, with six winners each, won the most among infielders, followed by third basemen (4). Four catchers and two pitchers won the award.

Eight players who won the Rookie of the Year Award also won the American Association Most Valuable Player Award in the same season: Jerry Witte (1946), Herb Score (1954), Jack Smith (1962), Barry Larkin (1986), Lance Johnson (1987), Juan González (1990), Eric Owens (1995), and Magglio Ordóñez (1997).

Seven players from the Denver Zephyrs and Indianapolis Indians were each selected for the Rookie of the Year Award, more than any other teams in the league, followed by the Milwaukee Brewers, Omaha Royals, Tulsa Oilers, and Wichita Aeros (3); the Iowa Cubs, Kansas City Blues, Louisville Redbirds, Nashville Sounds, Oklahoma City 89ers, Springfield Redbirds, and St. Paul Saints (2); and the Buffalo Bisons, Louisville Colonels, Minneapolis Millers, Omaha Cardinals, Omaha Dodgers, and Toledo Mud Hens (1).

Eight players from the St. Louis Cardinals Major League Baseball (MLB) organization won the award, more than any other, followed by the Chicago White Sox and Cincinnati Reds organizations (5); the Milwaukee Braves organization (4); the Cleveland Indians, Kansas City Royals, Los Angeles Dodgers, Montreal Expos, and New York Yankees organizations (3); the Baltimore Orioles, Chicago Cubs, and Texas Rangers organizations (2); and the Boston Red Sox, Milwaukee Brewers, and Pittsburgh Pirates organizations (1).

Winners

Wins by team

Wins by organization

References
Specific

General

1946 establishments in the United States
1997 disestablishments in the United States
Rookie
Awards established in 1946
Minor league baseball trophies and awards
Rookie player awards